The Bible in Worldwide English is a New Testament Bible in easy-to-read English. This New Testament was originally prepared by Annie Cressman, who died in 1993. She was a Canadian Bible teacher in Liberia in West Africa. While teaching students in an English-language Bible school, "she found that she was spending more time explaining the meaning of the English than she was teaching the Bible itself. Therefore, she decided to write this simple version in easy English so that her students could easily understand".

Publication commenced in 1959 with a trial version of Mark's Gospel.

Example text
Jesus saw that they believed he would be healed. So he said to the sick man, "Son, the wrong things you have done are forgiven".

See also
 The Bible in Basic English follows a similar approach.

References

External links
BibleGateway.com explains the background to this translation
SOON Ministries – the copyright owner of the BWE translation.

20th-century books
Bible translations into English
New Testament editions